Unduk Ngadau 2021, the 61st edition of the Unduk Ngadau, was held on 31 May 2021 at Hongkod Koisaan Hall, KDCA, Penampang, Sabah. Maya Hejnowska of Api-Api was crowned by the outgoing titleholder, Francisca Ester Nain of Karambunai at the end of the event. Different from the Unduk Ngadau competition from the past years, this edition was held with a strict health protocol as it was still in the era of Covid-19 pandemic.

Results 
21 finalists was selected by the judges from 79 delegates through online selection.

Contestants
79 delegates in total competed through online platform.

References

Beauty pageants in Malaysia
2021 beauty pageants